Sausage is an independent demo album by the band Baboon.  It was released on cassette in 1992.  This version of "Kamikaze" is also on the We're from Texas compilation.

Track listing
 "Hatred" – 2:52
 "Kamikaze" – 2:27
 "E" – 4:55
 "Fan In My Car" – 3:59
 "For You" – 5:11

All songs by Baboon.

Personnel
 Will Johnson - drums
 Andrew Huffstetler - vocals, trombone
 Bart Rogers - bass guitar, backing vocals
 Mike Rudnicki - guitar, backing vocals
 Sam McCall - backing vocals on "Fan In My Car"

1992 albums
Baboon (band) albums